L'Inflexible (S 615) is the sixth and final of the  SNLE ("Sous-marin Nucléaire Lanceur d'Engins", "Nuclear Missile-Launching Submarine") of the Force océanique stratégique (FOST), the submarine nuclear deterrent component of the French Navy.

Construction began on 27 March 1980. The boat was launched on 23 June 1982, commissioned on 1 April 1985 and decommissioned on 14 January 2008.

Design and construction
L'Inflexible uses basically the same design as the other Redoutable-class vessels, but has benefited from technological advances over its predecessors. The submarine uses the M4 missile, which carries 6 independent 150 kilotonnes of TNT equivalent nuclear warheads. The boat also has the capability of launching the SM39 Exocet anti-ship missile.

L'Inflexible received TIT (Traitement de l'Information Tactique, "Tactical Information Processor"), a cluster of French-designed computers and serial digital bus links for intersystem communication and DMUX21 sonar. The submarine has an improved inertial navigation system over other vessels of the class. The boat also has the improved internal communication system—SNTI, Système Numérisé de Transmissions Intérieures (Digital Internal Communication System).

Other miscellaneous improvements were made in electrical systems, nuclear systems, improving safety and stealth and rudder and engines, improving reliability and stealth. Inflexible has an improved hull profile.

The other Redoutable-class submarines have been modified to meet the standards of L'Inflexible ("Refonte M4"). L'Inflexible was officially decommissioned on 14 January 2008.

In popular culture 

L'Inflexible has inspired Le Soleil ne se lève pas pour nous ("No sunrise for us") by Robert Merle, a 1987 semi-fictitious book in form of a romanced documentary.

See also 

List of submarines of France

References

Redoutable-class submarines (1967)
Ships built in France
1982 ships
Cold War submarines of France